Artful Learning is an educational philosophy model that is concept-based and interdisciplinary. Artful Learning was initiated by Leonard Bernstein and is rooted in using the arts to enhance all areas of education.

History
In 1990, Leonard Bernstein received the Praemium Imperiale, an international prize awarded by the Japan Arts Association for lifetime achievement in the arts. Bernstein used the $100,000 prize to establish The Bernstein Education Through
the Arts (BETA) Fund, Inc. Leonard Bernstein provided this grant to develop an arts-based education program. The Leonard Bernstein Center was established in April 1992, and initiated extensive school-based research, resulting in the Bernstein Model. After six years of association with the Grammy Foundation, the Leonard Bernstein Center for Learning moved to Gettysburg College, PA.

Model

Artful Learning is based on Bernstein's philosophy that the arts can strengthen learning and be incorporated in all academic subjects. The program is based on "units of study," which each consist of four core elements: experience, inquire, create, and reflect.

Research

Research shows that participation in the arts plays a vital role in influencing brain development and performance. Arts, which are considered enrichment in education programs, may in fact be central to the way humans neurologically process and learn. In 1999, The President's Committee on the Arts and Humanities teamed up with the Arts Education Partnership to publish a comprehensive study on the inclusion of the arts in education.

See also
Alternative education
Project-based learning
Kindergarten
Montessori method
Waldorf education
Sudbury school
Summerhill School
Friedrich Fröbel
Reggio Children - Loris Malaguzzi Centre Foundation

References

Further reading
Artful Learning: Holistic Curriculum Development for Mind, Body, Heart, and Spirit
Students Make Sure the Cherokees Are Not Removed . . . Again: A Study of Service Learning and Artful Learning in Teaching History 
How singing helped healing: One Napa woman's story
Artful Learning Gifted & Talented Open House
Champions of change : the impact of the arts on learning
These museum tours for kids will engage little ones in artful learning
Why Our Schools Need the Arts

External links
 

Alternative education
Philosophy of education
School types
Early childhood education
Constructivism
 
Progressive education
Applied learning
Leonard Bernstein